The Qingjiang biota are a major discovery of fossilized remains dating from the early Cambrian period approximately 518 million years ago. The remains consist at least 20,000 individual specimens, and were discovered near the Danshui River in the Hubei province of China in 2019. The site is particularly notable due to both the large proportion of new taxa represented (approximately 53% of the specimens), and due to the large amount of soft-body tissue of the ancient specimens that was preserved, likely due to the organisms being rapidly covered in sediment prior to fossilization, that allowed for the detailed preservation of even fragile, soft-bodied creatures such as worms and jellyfish.

The site is a Burgess Shale type preservation, and has been widely compared to the Burgess Shale in terms of the site's richness and significance. The discovery has been described as one of the most significant of its kind in the last 100 years. Initial publications regarding the site stated that 4,351 of the collected specimens had been examined, and 101 species had been identified, 53 of which were new to science.

Talks are reportedly underway with local government to protect the site to ensure the longevity of continued research on the deposited specimens.

References 

Lagerstätten
Prehistoric fauna by locality
Cambrian China
Fossils of China
Paleontology in Hubei